Saint Hiltrude of Liessies (died late 700s) was a French Roman Catholic nun and virgin saint.

Life 
Hiltrude was the daughter of a Poitevin noble from Hainaut.

She resolved to remain a virgin, and fled her father's house when presented with a suitor. She returned only when she learned that the suitor had married her sister.

She took the veil and lived as a recluse in a cell attached to the church of Liessies. There she lived a life of prayer and penance until her death.

References

Citations

Bibliography 

 Borrelli, Antonio (15 February 2006). "Sant' Iltrude (Hiltrude) di Liessies Vergine". Santi, beati e testimoni - Enciclopedia dei Santi. Retrieved 19 April 2022.
 Commire, Anne, ed. (2007). "Hiltrude of Liessies". In Dictionary of Women Worldwide: 25,000 Women through the Ages. Vol. 1: A–L. Farmington Hills, MI: Thomson Gale. p. 879.
 Commission historique du Nord (1866). Bulletin de la Bulletin de la Commission historique du département du Nord. Lille: L. Danel. pp. 181–182.
 Godescard, Abbé (1831). "Ste Hiltrude". In Vies des Pères, des martyrs et des autres principaux saints. Translated from the English of Alban Butler. Vol. 14. Louvain: Valinthout and Vandenzande. pp. 164–170.
 Monks of Ramsgate (1921). "Hiltrude". In The Book of Saints. London: A. & C. Black, Ltd. pp. 136–137.
 Schäfer, Joachim (17 November 2015). "Hiltrud von Lissies". Ökumenisches Heiligenlexikon. Retrieved 19 April 2022.

External links 
 Delobelle, Adrien (1900). Sainte Hiltrude, vierge, patronne de Liessies. Bar-le-Duc: Saint-Paul.
 Tilmant, Mickaël, et al. (2014). "Liessies". L'Avesnois: ses villes, ses villages. Retrieved 19 April 2022.
 "Hiltrud von Lissies". Heilige: Fürsprecher bei Gott. Bonifatiuswerk. (8 October 2018). Retrieved 19 April 2022.
 "Sant'Iltrude di Liessies". Cathopedia, l'enciclopedia cattolica. (24 May 2012). Retrieved 19 April 2022.

Female saints of medieval France
8th-century births
8th-century deaths